Corinne's Place is a restaurant in Camden, New Jersey. In 2022 the restaurant was selected as an America's Classic by the James Beard Foundation.

History 
Corinne Bradley-Powers, a Camden native and lifelong resident and at the time a single mother, founded the restaurant on Haddon Avenue in Camden in 1989. Before starting the business, she was a social worker. She bought the property in 1985, but struggled to get a loan, and took on a catering job to fund the business. At first, the restaurant was open only on weekends. By 1995, it was open Wednesday through Saturday, with an all-day buffet on Sundays. Bradley-Powers was often joined in the kitchen by her mother, Fannie Anderson, who had taught her how to cook, while her own daughter worked as a waitress. At the time, she advertised the restaurant as "soul food with a touch of class".

In 2008, Corinne's Place was featured in a Gannett New Jersey article, which called it "a treasured part of Camden's community", noting that regulars often called on Bradley-Powers for catering weddings and other events.

When the James Beard foundation announced the 2022 America's Classics list, friends texted Bradley-Powers to congratulate her; she had never heard of the foundation or its namesake.

Menu 
The restaurant focuses on southern specialties such as fried chicken, pigs feet, smothered pork chops, turkey wings, fried catfish, black-eyed peas, greens, cornbread, and sweet potatoes. Philadelphia Inquirer dining editor Craig LaBan called Bradley-Powers “the queen of soul food” the restaurant's fried chicken “unforgettable.”

Recognition 
In 2022 the restaurant was selected as an America's Classic by the James Beard Foundation; the foundation in their announcement called the restaurant "a pillar of community at the heart of one of America’s lowest-income cities". NBC News in 2020 called the restaurant "acclaimed". Local and regional media have called the restaurant "iconic" and Bradley-Powers a pillar of her community.

Ownership 
Bradley-Powers sold the restaurant to Trevor Vaughan and Craig Sawyer in 2019 and maintains a consulting role.

References

Further reading

External links

1989 establishments in New Jersey
Buildings and structures in Camden, New Jersey
James Beard Foundation Award winners
Restaurants established in 1989
Restaurants in New Jersey
Soul food restaurants in the United States